Verdun Maple Leafs may refer to:

 Verdun Maple Leafs (ice hockey)
 Verdun Maple Leafs (football team), previously known as Notre-Dame-de-Grace Maple Leafs